Educated Evans may refer to:

Educated Evans (novel), 1924 novel by Edgar Wallace and first novel in a trilogy
Educated Evans (film), 1936 film based on the novel 
Educated Evans (TV series), 1957–1958 TV series based on the novel